St Edmundsbury was a local government district and borough in Suffolk, England.  It was named after its main town, Bury St Edmunds.  The second town in the district was Haverhill. The population of the district was 111,008 at the 2011 Census.

The district was formed on 1 April 1974 under the Local Government Act 1972 (along with the abolition of the county of West Suffolk) by the merger of the Borough of Bury St Edmunds, Haverhill Urban District, Clare Rural District and Thingoe Rural District.

Until March 2009, its main offices were in Bury St Edmunds (Angel Hill and Western Way). Thereafter, a purpose-built complex named West Suffolk House housed both St Edmundsbury and Suffolk County Council staff.

In 2008, the Council submitted a proposal to the Boundary Commission which would see it as central to a new West Suffolk unitary council. However, the proposal was rejected and no unitary scheme for Suffolk was adopted.  (For more details see also Suffolk.)

In October 2011, St Edmundsbury Borough Council and Forest Heath District Council agreed to have one chief executive, a shared management team and a combined workforce.

St Edmundsbury and Forest Heath were merged on 1 April 2019 to form the new West Suffolk district.

List of communities

Freedom of the Borough
The following people and military units have received the Freedom of the Borough of St Edmundsbury.

Individuals
 Councillor Ronald Hartley: 1999.

Military Units
 3rd Air Force, USAF: 2000.
 The Normandy Veterans' Association (Bury St Edmunds and District Branch No35): 2004.
 1st Battalion The Royal Anglian Regiment: 2006.
 3 Regiment Army Air Corps (Wattisham): 2010.

Arms

See also
St Edmundsbury local elections

References

 
Non-metropolitan districts of Suffolk
Former non-metropolitan districts
Former boroughs in England
West Suffolk District